The Kurze Mountains are a range of mainly bare rock peaks, ridges and mountains about  long and  wide in the Orvin Mountains of Queen Maud Land, Antarctica. The feature stands between the Drygalski Mountains on the west and the Gagarin Mountains and Conrad Mountains on the east.

The Kurze Mountains were discovered and plotted from aerial photographs taken by the Third German Antarctic Expedition under Alfred Ritscher, 1938–39, who named them for the director of the Naval Division of the former Marineleitung (German Admiralty). They were remapped by the Norsk Polarinstitutt from surveys and aerial photos taken by the Sixth Norwegian Antarctic Expedition, 1956–60, and given the name "Holtedahlfjella." The correlation of the prior name (Kurze) with this feature is quite definite and is recommended for the sake of international uniformity and historical continuity.

See also
Gruvleflesa Knolls
Hålishalsen Saddle

References

Mountain ranges of Queen Maud Land
Orvin Mountains